In Japanese, the term kōraku in Kōrakuen (後楽園, "Kōraku Park") refers to later pleasures. It comes from a yojijukugo  which means "hardship now, pleasure later." It is derived from a poem by Fan Zhongyan.

Places named Korakuen include:
Kōraku-en, a garden in Okayama Prefecture
 In Bunkyo, Tokyo:
Koishikawa Kōrakuen Garden, a garden
Korakuen Hall, a sports arena
Korakuen Stadium, a former stadium
Kōrakuen Station, a subway station
Korakuen Velodrome. a former velodrome